Chipao District is one of twenty-one districts of the province Lucanas in Peru.

Geography Not Historical 
Some of the highest mountains in the district are Rasuwillka and Qarwarasu. Other mountains are listed below:

Ethnic groups 
The people in the district are mainly indigenous citizens of Quechua descent. Quechua is the language which the majority of the population (73.03%) learnt to speak in childhood, 26.54% of the residents started speaking using the Spanish language (per the 2007 Peru Census).

See also

References